The Court of Session Act 1810 was an Act of the Parliament of the United Kingdom (citation 50 Geo. III c. 112) reforming Scotland's highest court, the Court of Session. This Act was a follow-up Act to the Court of Session Act 1808 in reforming the Court of Session, creating the two divisions known as the Inner House and the Outer House.

Reform continued with the Court of Session Act 1813 which created the final form of the Outer House, and the Jury Trials (Scotland) Act 1815 which introduced trial by jury.

It was repealed by the Court of Session Act 1988

References

1810 in British law
Court of Session
Acts of the Parliament of the United Kingdom concerning Scotland
United Kingdom Acts of Parliament 1810
1810 in Scotland
Repealed United Kingdom Acts of Parliament